Modulation spaces are a family of Banach spaces defined by the behavior of the short-time Fourier transform with
respect to a test function from the Schwartz space. They were originally proposed by Hans Georg Feichtinger and are recognized to be the right kind of function spaces for time-frequency analysis. Feichtinger's algebra, while originally introduced as a new Segal algebra, is identical to a certain modulation space and has become a widely used space of test functions for time-frequency analysis.

Modulation spaces are defined as follows.
is defined by

The space  is the same, independent of the test function  chosen. The canonical choice is a Gaussian.

We also have a Besov-type definition of modulation spaces as follows.

,
where  is a suitable unity partition. If , then .

Feichtinger's algebra 

It is for these and more properties that  is a natural choice of test function space for time-frequency analysis.

References

Banach spaces